Godaita (Nepali: गोडैटा) is a municipality in Sarlahi District, a part of Province No. 2 in Nepal. It was formed in 2016 occupying current 12 sections (wards) from previous 12 former VDCs. It occupies an area of 48.62 km2 with a total population of 42,315.  

The previous VDCs which are included to form this municipality are Godaita, Bahadurpur, Belwa Jabdi, Bhagwatipur, Rohuwa, Ramban, Bagdah and Sisautiya. Among of them Godaita is main and highly populated areas and developed. Godaita bazzar is one of biggest marketing hub in the Sarlahi district from olden days.

References

Populated places in Sarlahi District
Nepal municipalities established in 2017
Municipalities in Madhesh Province